Salix lasiolepis (arroyo willow) is a species of willow native to western North America.

Distribution
The core range of the arroyo willow includes most of California, including the California Coast Ranges, Arizona, Klamath Mountains, Peninsular Ranges, Sierra Nevada, and Transverse Ranges. It extends north into Washington, south into Baja California, and east into Idaho, Utah, Texas, and Coahuila (México).

Habitat
The plant is commonly found growing in riparian zones in canyons and valleys, along pond shores, and in marshes and wetlands. It is found in many plant communities, including: chaparral, oak woodland, mixed evergreen forest, coast redwood forest, yellow pine forest, red fir forest, lodgepole pine forest, and grasslands.

Allergenicity
Arroyo Willow (Salix lasiolepis) is a severe allergen.

Pollination
Occurs in following seasons depending on latitude and elevation: Spring.

Description
The shoots are yellowish brown and densely hairy when young. They are green above and glaucous green below. The undersides are covered with whitish or rusty hairs which gradually wear off during the summer.

The bloom period is February to May.

Varieties
Salix lasiolepis var. bigelovii — Bigelow's willow, endemic to California and Oregon. Currently reclassified as species Salix lasiolepis.
Salix lasiolepis var. lasiolepis — Tracy Willow, endemic to narrow Pacific coastal zone in NW California and SW Oregon. Currently reclassified as species Salix lasiolepis.

Uses
The indigenous peoples of California used the species in various ways. As a traditional medicinal plant, infusions of the leaves, bark, or flowers were used for several disease remedies. The inner bark was used to make rope. Shoots were used in coiled and twined basketry, and branches were used to make acorn storage baskets.

References

External links
 
 
 Lady Bird Johnson Wildflower Center−NPIN database
 
 
 

lasiolepis
Flora of the Southwestern United States
Flora of the Northwestern United States
Flora of the South-Central United States
Flora of Northwestern Mexico
Flora of Northeastern Mexico
Flora of California
Natural history of the California chaparral and woodlands
Plants used in traditional Native American medicine
Taxa named by George Bentham